Extinct is the tenth full-length album by the Portuguese gothic metal band Moonspell, released on 5 March 2015 in several versions with a different cover for each (jewel case, LTD deluxe box, mediabook, gatefold LP).

The album was recorded at Fascination Street Studios, and was produced and mixed by Jens Bogren. The cover artwork was designed by Seth Siro Anton. It includes a guest bozuoukitara performance by Yossi Sassi on the track "Medusalem". Also, on that same track, before the guitar solo starts, another guest artist, Mahafsoun, narrates the chorus in the Persian language.

Track listing 
All songs written by Moonspell, all lyrics by Fernando Ribeiro

Personnel 
Fernando Ribeiro – vocals
Ricardo Amorim – guitars
Aires Pereira – bass
Pedro Paixão – keyboards, samples
Miguel Gaspar – drums

Charts

References 

MOONSPELL – Announce New Album Details! - Napalm Records
Moonspell- Extinct – Encyclopaedia Metallum

2015 albums
Moonspell albums
Napalm Records albums
Albums with cover art by Spiros Antoniou
Albums produced by Jens Bogren